The Diocese of Cremona is a Latin Church ecclesiastical territory or diocese of the Catholic Church in northern Italy. It is a suffragan diocese in the ecclesiastical province of the metropolitan Archdiocese of Milan. The bishop of Cremona's cathedra is in the Cathedral of the Assumption of the Virgin Mary.

, the Diocese of Cremona had 223 parishes, all located within the region of Lombardy, and the majority (174)  within the Province of Cremona, besides  28 in the Province of Mantua, 17 in the Province of Bergamo, and 4 in the Province of Milan.

History

Cremona is in Lombardy, Italy, on the left (north) bank of the River Po. It was built by the Cenomani Gauls, but later became a Roman colony and a frontier fortress.

The tradition of Cremona considers St. Sabinus to be its first missionary and first bishop; he is said to have lived in the 1st century, though there is no documentary or monumental proof of his existence. His putative successor, Felix (c. 86) is known only from the name of a church. Among the early bishops are S. Syrinus (c. 340), a mere name but said to be a vigorous opponent of Arianism because of his alleged date, and S. Silvinus (733). Liudprand of Cremona was sent (946) as ambassador to Constantinople by the Emperor Otto II, and is a noted historical writer of the 10th century.

On 21 September 603, Cremona, until then a part of the Byzantine Empire, was captured by the Lombard king, Agilulf and completely destroyed. Under the Emperor Otto I (962–973) and his successors, its bishops acquired temporal sovereignty, but the people expelled Bishop Oldericus (973–1004) and adopted a republican form of government. On 26 February 1004, Bishop Oldericus obtained from Adelmus (a.k.a. Azo), the royal Missus of King Arduin (1002–1014), the royal ban against anyone who attempted to seize properties belonging to the bishop.

In 987, Bishop Oldericus founded a Benedictine monastery in honor of S. Lawrence in Cremona. In 1546 the Benedictines were succeeded by Olivetan monks. The monastery was suppressed by the French occupation administration in 1797.

In 1104, the diocese received a new bishop, Landulfus, a German and a Councillor and Chaplain of the Emperor Henry II, whose ascent was patronized by Henry's queen, Cunegonda. Landulfus was insensitive, arrogant, and overbearing. He was particularly hostile to his predecessor's foundation, the monastery of S. Lorenzo. His ill-treatment of the monks roused the anger of the citizens of Cremona, who had already twice suffered under the invasion of German imperial armies. They expelled Bishop Landulfus from the city, confiscated all his goods, and razed the bishop's castle to its foundations. The bishop's servants who were inside the castle were able to make an arrangement with the canons of the cathedral to ransom themselves with all of their goods, but their houses were destroyed. Bishop Landulfus was not able to reoccupy his episcopal seat until around 1010.

The Emperor Henry IV (1056–1106), however, confirmed Bishop Landulf in all imperial grants made to his predecessors. On the other hand Emperor Henry V (1106–25) restored to the people their communal rights. Thenceforth Cremona became a citadel of Ghibellinism and was greatly favoured by Frederic Barbarossa and Emperor Frederick II, though for the same reason frequently at war with the neighbouring cities.

In 1107, the city committed itself to the building of a new cathedral, and laid the first cornerstone in the absence of the bishop. In 1113, after his return, Bishop Landulfus held a diocesan synod, but the city was consumed by a fire on 10 August 1113.

In 1550, Cardinal Francesco Sfondrati, Bishop of Cremona (1549–1550), issued a set of constitutions and edicts to be observed in his diocese. In his letter of transmittal, he admits that his predecessors for more than seventy years, because of their long absences, had allowed some of the clergy and people of the diocese to go wrong, which made corrections both beneficial and necessary.

Bishop Cesare Speciano (1591–1607) held a diocesan synod in Cremona in 1599. He held his second diocesan synod in 1604.  Cardinal Pietro Campori (1621–1643) held a diocesan synod in 1635.

Bishop Alessandro Litta (1718–1749) held a diocesan synod in the cathedral in Cremona on 28–30 April 1727.

Bishops

The Diocese of Cremona provides a list of its bishops on its official web site. Of the bishops of the first eight centuries, it recognizes only Joannes (451), Eustasius (501), Desiderius (679), and Stephanus (774).

to 900

 Stephanus (320–342 ?)
 Sirinus (342–380)
 Auderius (381–391)
 Conradus
 Vincenzo (407–?)
 Sirinus II (422–451)
 Joannes I (attested 451)
 Eustasius, Eustachius (491– c. 513)
 Crisogonus (513–537)
 Felix (537–562)
 Creato (563 – c. 584)
 Sisto (584 – c. 609)
 Desiderius (609–610)
 Anselm (610–?)
 Eusebius (c. 637–?)
 Bernard (670–?)
 Desiderius (attested 679)
 Zeno, OSB (703–?)
 Silvino (733–?)
 Stephen II (776–?)
 Walfred (816–818)
 Atto (818–823)
 Siniperto degli Addobati (823–840?)
 Panchoardus (840–851?)
 Benedictus (c. 851 – c. 881)
 Lando (c. 881–c.910?)

900 to 1200

 Joannes (attested c. 915–924)
 Dagibertus (attested 931–960)                           
 Liutprand (attested 962–970/972)
 Oldericus (attested 973–1004)
 Landulfus (1007–1030) 
 Ubaldus (1031–1067)
Arnulfus (1068–1078)
Walterius (attested 1096)
Ugo de Noceto 
Ubertus (1087–1095)
...
Ubertus (1118–1162)
Presbyter de Medolao (1163–1167)
 Emmanuel, O.Cist. (1 May  1167 – 27 February 1168)    
 Offredo degli Offredi (1168–1185) 
 Sicardus (1185–1215)

1200 to 1500

 Omobono de Madalberti (c. 1215–1248)
 Giovanni Buono de Geroldi (1248–1249) (bishop-elect)
 Bernerio (1249 – c. 1260)
 Cacciaconte da Somma (1261–1288)
 Ponzio Ponzoni (1288–1290)
 Bonizo (c. 1290– c. 1294)
 Raynerius de Casulo (1296–1312)
[Egidiolo Bonseri (1313–1317)] 	
Egidio Madalberti (1318–1325) 	Bishop-elect
Ugolino di San Marco, O.P. (1327–1349)
Dondino (1328–1331) Intrusus
Ugolino Ardengheri (1349–1361) 	 
Pietro Capello (1361–1383) 	 
Marco Porri (1383–1386)  	 
Giorgio Torti (1386–1389) 	 
Tommaso Visconti (1390) 	 
Francesco Lante, O.F.M. (1390–1401)   
Pietro Grassi (1401–1402)
Francesco Lante (1402–1405)	 
Bartolomeo Capra (1405–1411) 	 
Costanzo Fondulo (1412–1423)
Venturino de Marni, OSB (1423–1457) 
Bernardo Rossi (1458–1466)  
Giovanni Stefano Botticelli (1466–1472)
Jacopo-Antonio dalla Torre (1476–1486)
Cardinal Ascanio Maria Sforza (1486–1505) Administrator

1500 to 1800

Cardinal Galeotto Franciotti della Rovere (1505–1507 Resigned) Administrator
 Gerolamo Trevisan, O.Cist. (1507–1523)
Pietro Accolti (1523/4, resigned)
Benedetto Accolti (1523–1549)
Cardinal Francesco Sfondrati (1549–1550)
Federico Cesi (1551–1560 Resigned)
Niccolò Sfondrati (1560–1590)
Cesare Speciano (1591–1607)
Cardinal Paolo Camillo Sfondrati (1607–1610 Resigned)
Giambattista Brivio (1610–1621)
Cardinal Pietro Campori (1621–1643)
Francesco Visconti (1643–1670 Resigned)
Pietro Isimbardi, O. Carm. (1670–1675)
Agostino Isimbardi, O.S.B. (1676–1681 Died)
Lodovico Septala (1682–1697)
Alessandro Croce (1697–1704)
Carlo Ottaviano Guasco (1704–1717)
Alessandro Maria Litta (1718–1749 Resigned)
Ignazio Maria Fraganeschi (1749–1790)
Omobono Offredi (1791–1829)

since 1831

Carlo Emmanuelle Sardagna de Hohenstein (1831–1837 Resigned)
Bartolomeo Casati (1839–1844)
Bartolomeo Carlo Romilli (1846–1847)
Antonio Novasconi (1850–1867)
Geremia Bonomelli (1871–1914)
Giovanni Cazzani (1914–1952)
Danio Bolognini (1952–1972)
Giuseppe Amari (1973–1978)
Fiorino Tagliaferri (1978–1983 Resigned)
Enrico Assi (1983–1992)
Giulio Nicolini (1993–2001)
Dante Lafranconi (2001–2015 Retired)
Antonio Napolioni (2015–)

See also
 List of bishops of Cremona (in Italian)
 Timeline of Cremona

Notes

Bibliography

Episcopal lists

 pp. 777–779. (in Latin)
 (in Latin) 
 (in Latin)
 (in Latin)
 (in Latin)

 (in Latin)

Studies
Annales Cremonenses (ed. O. Holder-Egger). In: 
 

Cremona città imperiale. Nell’VIII centenario della nascita di Federico II. Atti del Convegno Internazionale di Studi (Cremona, 27-28 ottobre 1995). Cremona 1999 (Annali della Biblioteca Statale e Libreria civica di Cremona, XLIX). 

Filippini, E. (2001), "Il vescovo Sicardo di Cremona (1185-1215) e la fondazione del monastero di San Giovanni del Deserto," in Annali dell'Istituto storico italogermanico in Trento XXVII (2001), pp. 13–56. 
Gualazzini, U. (1972). "Falsificazioni di fonti dell’età paleocristiana e altomedievale nella storiografia cremonese". Cremona 1975 (Annali delle Biblioteca Statale e Libreria Civica di Cremon, XXIII, 1972), pp. 31–32, 51-78. 
Kehr, Paul Fridolin (1913). Italia pontificia : sive, Repertorium privilegiorum et litterarum a romanis pontificibus ante annum 1598 Italiae ecclesiis, monasteriis, civitatibus singulisque personis concessorum. Vol. VI. pars i. Berolini: Weidmann. 
 Lanzoni, Francesco (1927). Le diocesi d'Italia dalle origini al principio del secolo VII (an. 604), vol. II, Faenza 1927. 
 Leoni, Valeria (2005). "Privilegia episcopii Cremonensis. Il cartulario vescovile di Cremona e il vescovo Sicardo (1185-1215)".  Scrineum Rivista, 3 (Firenze: Firenze UP 2005), pp. 75–122.
Novati, Francesco, "L' Obituario della cattedrale di Cremona," in:  VII (Milano 1880), pp. 245–276.  VIII (1881), pp. 246–266, and 484-506. 

Schwartz, Gerhard (1907). Die Besetzung der Bistümer Reichsitaliens unter den sächsischen und salischen Kaisern: mit den Listen der Bischöfe, 951-1122. Leipzig: B.G. Teubner. pp. 109–115. 
Sigard, Bishop of Cremona. Cronica (ed. O. Holder-Egger). In:

External links
Benigni, Umberto. "Cremona." The Catholic Encyclopedia. Vol. 4. New York: Robert Appleton Company, 1908. Retrieved: 7 October 2020. [obsolete; there is a new edition]

Cremona
Province of Bergamo
Province of Cremona
Province of Mantua
Cremona